Tondu Rugby Football Club is a rugby union team from the village of Aberkenfig, South Wales. They presently play in the Welsh Rugby Union Championship and are a feeder club for the Ospreys.

During the early 1990s Tondu RFC dominated the Glamorgan County Silver Ball competition, winning the trophy in 1991, 1992 and 1993. Tondu are the joint leading winners of the competition having now won it on four occasions.

An ad first appeared in "The Western Mail" on 22 November 1879, announcing the formation of the Tondu Football Club.

Club badge
The club badge consists of a shield housing three Celtic crosses and a waterwheel symbolising the water mill that once stood on the River Ogmore.

Club honours
Glamorgan County Silver Ball Trophy - 1986-87 Winners
Glamorgan County Silver Ball Trophy - 1990-91 Winners
Glamorgan County Silver Ball Trophy - 1991-92 Winners
Glamorgan County Silver Ball Trophy - 1993-94 Winners

Notable former players
see also :Category:Tondu RFC players
The following are former Tondu players who have been capped at international level.

 Keith Bradshaw
 JPR Williams
 Neil Boobyer
 Gavin Thomas
 Lee Byrne
 Owen Watkin
 Ryan Matyas

External links
 Tondu Rugby Football Club

References 

Welsh rugby union teams
Rugby clubs established in 1880